L'Attaque is a board game first published in France in 1909 that inspired the creation of later games such as Stratego.

Publication history
In nearly its present form Stratego appeared in France from La Samaritaine in 1910, and then in Britain before World War I, as a game called L'attaque.  Historian and game collector Thierry Depaulis writes:

It was in fact designed by a lady, Mademoiselle Hermance Edan, who filed a patent for a "jeu de bataille avec pièces mobiles sur damier" (a battle game with mobile pieces on a gameboard) on 1908-11-26. The patent was released by the French Patent Office in 1909 (patent #396.795). Hermance Edan had given no name to her game but a French manufacturer named Au Jeu Retrouvé was selling the game as L'Attaque as early as 1910.

Depaulis further notes that the 1910 version was played with 36 pieces per player on a 9×10 board and the armies were divided into red and blue colors. The rules of L'attaque were basically the same as for the game we know as Stratego. It featured standing cardboard rectangular pieces, color printed with soldiers who wore contemporary (to 1900) uniforms, not Napoleonic uniforms.  In papers of her estate, Ms. Edan states that she developed the game in the 1880s.

L'attaque was later produced in England by game maker H.P. Gibson and Sons, who bought the rights to the game in 1925, at least until the 1970s, initially retaining the French name before changing it.

Reviews
Games & Puzzles

References

External links

Board games introduced in the 1900s